Belarus competed at the 2016 Summer Olympics in Rio de Janeiro, Brazil, from 5 to 21 August 2016. It was the nation's sixth consecutive appearance at the Summer Olympics in the post-Soviet era.

Medalists

| width=78% align=left valign=top |

| width=22% align=left valign=top |

Competitors

| width=78% align=left valign=top |
The following is the list of number of competitors participating in the Games. Note that reserves in fencing, field hockey, football, and handball are not counted as athletes:

Archery

One Belarusian archer has qualified for the men's individual recurve at the Olympics by virtue of a top five national finish at the 2016 Archery World Cup meet in Antalya, Turkey.

Athletics

Belarusian athletes have so far achieved qualifying standards in the following athletics events (up to a maximum of 3 athletes in each event):

A total of 36 athletes (14 men and 22 women) were named to the Belarusian track and field roster, as part of the nation's official team announcement on 25 July 2016, including two-time Olympic medalist Ivan Tsikhan, 2015 Worlds middle-distance champion Maryna Arzamasava, hurdler Alina Talai, and javelin thrower Tatsiana Khaladovich.

Track & road events
Men

Women

Field events
Men

Women

Basketball

Women's tournament

Belarus women's basketball team qualified for the Olympics by winning the fifth-place match over South Korea and securing the last of five remaining berths at the 2016 FIBA World Olympic Qualifying Tournament in Nantes, France, signifying the nation's return to the sport for the first time since 2008.

Team roster

Group play

Boxing

Belarus has entered three boxers to compete in the following weight classes into the Olympic boxing tournament. Bantamweight boxer Dzmitry Asanau became the first Belarusian to be selected to the Olympic team, following a top three finish and a box-off victory at the 2015 World Championships. Meanwhile, Pavel Kastramin and London 2012 Olympian Mikhail Dauhaliavets had claimed their Olympic spots at the 2016 AIBA World Qualifying Tournament in Baku, Azerbaijan.

Canoeing

Sprint
Belarusian canoeists have qualified one boat in each of the following events through the 2015 ICF Canoe Sprint World Championships. On 16 July 2016, the International Canoe Federation (ICF) imposed a one-year suspension on the entire Belarusian canoeing team for a widespread doping that would effectively banned them from the Olympics. Despite that the Belarusian canoeists managing to file their appeal to the Court of Arbitration for Sport (CAS), only the women were cleared to compete.

Qualification Legend: FA = Qualify to final (medal); FB = Qualify to final B (non-medal)

Cycling

Road
Belarusian riders qualified for the following quota places in the men's and women's Olympic road race by virtue of their top 15 final national ranking in the 2015 UCI Europe Tour (for men) and top 22 in the 2016 UCI World Ranking (for women).

Track
Following the completion of the 2016 UCI Track Cycling World Championships, Belarus has entered one rider to compete in women's omnium at the Olympics, by virtue of her final individual UCI Olympic ranking in that event.

Omnium

Diving

Belarusian divers qualified for the following individual and synchronized team spots at the 2016 Summer Olympics through the World Championships and FINA World Cup series.

Fencing

Belarus has entered one fencer into the Olympic competition. London 2012 Olympian Aliaksandr Buikevich had claimed his Olympic spot in the men's sabre by finishing among the top 14 individual fencers in the FIE Adjusted Official Rankings.

Gymnastics

Artistic
Belarus has entered two artistic gymnasts into the Olympic competition. Andrey Likhovitskiy and American-born Kylie Dickson had claimed their Olympic spots each in the men's and women's apparatus and all-around events, respectively, at the Olympic Test Event in Rio de Janeiro.

Men

Women

Rhythmic 
Belarus has qualified a squad of rhythmic gymnasts for the individual and group all-around by finishing in the top 15 (for individual) and top 10 (for group) at the 2015 World Championships in Stuttgart, Germany. The rhythmic gymnastics squad was named as part of the nation's official team announcement on 25 July 2016.

Trampoline
Belarus has qualified a total of three gymnasts (one male and two females) in both men's and women's trampoline by virtue of a top eight finish at the 2015 World Championships in Odense, Denmark.

Judo

Belarus has qualified two judokas for each of the following weight classes at the Games. Dzmitry Shershan was ranked among the top 22 eligible judokas for men in the IJF World Ranking List of 30 May 2016, while Darya Skrypnik at women's half-lightweight (52 kg) earned a continental quota spot from the European region as the highest-ranked Belarusian judoka outside of direct qualifying position.

Modern pentathlon

Belarus has entered one modern pentathlete into the women's event at the Games. Going to her third straight Olympics, Anastasiya Prokopenko was ranked among the top 10 modern pentathletes, not yet qualified, based on the UIPM World Rankings as of 1 June 2016.

Rowing

Belarus has qualified five boats for each of the following rowing classes into the Olympic regatta. Four rowing crews had confirmed Olympic places for their boats each in the men's single sculls, men's four, women's pair, and women's double sculls at the 2015 FISA World Championships in Lac d'Aiguebelette, France, while a women's single sculls rower had added one more boat to the Belarusian roster as a result of her top three finish at the 2016 European & Final Qualification Regatta in Lucerne, Switzerland.

Men

Women

Qualification Legend: FA=Final A (medal); FB=Final B (non-medal); FC=Final C (non-medal); FD=Final D (non-medal); FE=Final E (non-medal); FF=Final F (non-medal); SA/B=Semifinals A/B; SC/D=Semifinals C/D; SE/F=Semifinals E/F; QF=Quarterfinals; R=Repechage

Sailing

Belarusian sailors have qualified one boat in each of the following classes through the 2014 ISAF Sailing World Championships, the individual fleet Worlds, and European qualifying regattas. Meanwhile, the men's RS:X spot had been re-allocated to the Belarusian team as the next highest-ranked eligible NOC, after New Zealand decided to reject the berth won by JP Tobin at the 2014 World Championships.

M = Medal race; EL = Eliminated – did not advance into the medal race

Shooting

Belarusian shooters have achieved quota places for the following events by virtue of their best finishes at the 2014 and 2015 ISSF World Championships, the 2015 ISSF World Cup series, and European Championships or Games, as long as their minimum qualifying scored (MQS) were fulfilled by 31 March 2016.

Rifle shooters Vitali Bubnovich, Illia Charheika, and Yury Shcherbatsevich, as well as pistol ace and four-time Olympian Viktoria Chaika, were officially named to the Olympic roster on 13 July 2016. Having missed a chance to defend his Olympic title in men's 50 m rifle prone, Sergei Martynov offered a special role at the Games as the head coach of the Belarusian rifle shooting team.

Qualification Legend: Q = Qualify for the next round; q = Qualify for the bronze medal (shotgun)

Swimming

Belarusian swimmers have so far achieved qualifying standards in the following events (up to a maximum of 2 swimmers in each event at the Olympic Qualifying Time (OQT), and potentially 1 at the Olympic Selection Time (OST)): To secure their nomination to the Olympic team, swimmers must attain a top two finish under the FINA Olympic qualifying A standard in each of the individual pool events at the Belarusian Open (20 to 23 April) in Brest.

Six swimmers (four men and two women) were selected to the Belarusian team for the Games, with double silver medalist Aliaksandra Herasimenia and butterfly stalwart Pavel Sankovich leading them and racing in the pool at their third straight Olympics.

Synchronized swimming

Belarus has fielded a squad of two synchronized swimmers to compete only in the women's duet by picking up one of four spare berths freed by the continental selection for being the next highest ranking nation at the FINA Olympic test event in Rio de Janeiro, signifying their nation's Olympic comeback to the sport since 2008.

Table tennis

Belarus has entered three athletes into the table tennis competition at the Games. Olympic veterans Vladimir Samsonov and Viktoria Pavlovich were automatically selected among the top 22 eligible players each in their respective singles events based on the ITTF Olympic Rankings. Meanwhile, London 2012 Olympian Aleksandra Privalova was granted an invitation from ITTF to compete in the women's singles as one of the next seven highest-ranked eligible players, not yet qualified, on the Olympic Ranking List.

Taekwondo

Belarus entered one athlete into the taekwondo competition for the first time at the Olympics. Arman-Marshall Silla secured a place in the men's heavyweight category (+80 kg) by virtue of his top two finish at the 2016 European Qualification Tournament in Istanbul, Turkey.

Tennis

Belarus has entered two tennis players into the Olympic tournament. Two-time Australian Open champion and double Olympic medalist Victoria Azarenka (world no. 39) qualified directly as one of the top 56 eligible players in the WTA World Rankings as of 6 June 2016. Reigning mixed doubles champion and four-time Olympian Max Mirnyi teamed up with his London 2012 partner Aliaksandr Bury to compete for the second time in the men's doubles.

On 15 July 2016, Azarenka announced her withdrawal from the Games due to expected pregnancy with her first child, leaving only Bury and Mirnyi on the tennis team.

Weightlifting

Belarusian weightlifters have qualified a maximum of six men's and four women's quota places for the Rio Olympics based on their combined team standing by points at the 2014 and 2015 IWF World Championships. The team must allocate these places to individual athletes by 20 June 2016.

On 22 June 2016, the International Weightlifting Federation had decided to strip of one Olympic men's and women's entry place each from Belarus because of "multiple positive cases" of doping throughout the qualifying period.

Men

Women

Wrestling

Belarus has qualified a total of eight wrestlers for each the following weight classes into the Olympic competition. Two of them finished among the top six to book Olympic spots each in the men's Greco-Roman 59 kg and women's freestyle 75 kg at the 2015 World Championships, while three more berths were awarded to the Belarusian wrestlers, who progressed to the top two finals at the 2016 European Qualification Tournament.

Two further wrestlers had claimed the remaining Olympic slots each in men's Greco-Roman 85 & 98 kg to round out the Belarusian roster at the initial meet of the World Qualification Tournament in Ulaanbaatar.

On 28 July 2016, United World Wrestling awarded an additional Olympic license to Belarus in men's freestyle 57 kg, as the next highest-ranked nation, not yet qualified, at the World Championships one year earlier, and as a response to the previous doping bans on Russian qualified wrestlers, and to the implications in the McClaren Report on Russian state-sponsored doping allegations.

Men's freestyle

Men's Greco-Roman

Women's freestyle

See also
Belarus at the 2016 Summer Paralympics

References

External links 

 

Olympics
2016
Nations at the 2016 Summer Olympics